Neeli Cherkovski (born Nelson Cherry; July 1, 1945) is an American poet and memoirist, who has resided since 1975 in San Francisco.

Biography
Born in Santa Monica, California, Cherkovski grew up in San Bernardino, California. In the 1970s he was a political consultant in the Riverside area, who came to San Francisco to work on the staff of then-State Senator George Moscone. Cherkovski has written biographies of Lawrence Ferlinghetti, and Charles Bukowski, with whom he co-edited the Los Angeles zine Laugh Literary and Man the Humping Guns.. Cherkovski produced the first San Francisco Poetry Festival, and in the early-1990s helped to found Café Arts Month, a yearly event celebrating San Francisco's café culture.

Poetry critic Gerald Nicosia said of Cherkovski: "...in the end, what stamps Cherkovski’s poetry as unique is its unbounded lyricism, a lyrical gift easily greater than that of any other poet of his generation."

Cherkovski is the author of Whitman's Wild Children, a collection of essays about twelve poets he has known: Michael McClure, Charles Bukowski, John Wieners, James Broughton, Philip Lamantia, Bob Kaufman, Allen Ginsberg, William Everson, Gregory Corso, Harold Norse, Jack Micheline, and Lawrence Ferlinghetti. This book combines biography, personal stories, and poetry analyses.

Cherkovski was a writer-in-residence at the New College of California in San Francisco. He taught literature and philosophy there until the school closed in 2008. His body of poetry includes Animal, Elegy for Bob Kaufman and Leaning Against Time, for which he was awarded the 15th Annual PEN Oakland/Josephine Miles Literary Award in 2005. In 2017 he was awarded the Jack Mueller Poetry Prize by Lithic Press. Cherkovski's papers are housed at the Bancroft Library, University of California, Berkeley.

Bibliography
 Don't Make a Move (Tecumseh Press, 1974)
 The Waters Reborn (Red Hill Press, 1975)
 Public Notice (Beatitude, 1975)
 Ferlinghetti, a biography (DoubleDay, 1979)
 Love Proof (Green Light Press, 1980)
 Juggler Within (Harwood Alley Monographs, 1983)
 Clear Wind (Avant Books, 1984)
 Whitman's Wild Children (Lapis Press, 1989)
 Hank: The Life of Charles Bukowski (Random House, 1991)
 Animal (Pantograph Press, 1996)
 Elegy for Bob Kaufman (Sun Dog Press, 1996)
 Leaning Against Time (R.L. Crow Publications, 2004)
 Naming the Nameless (Sore Dove Press, 2004)
 From the Canyon Outward (R.L. Crow Publications, 2009)]  
 From the Middle Woods (New Native Press, 2011)
 Manila Poems (Bottle of Smoke Press, 2013)
 Elegy for My Beat Generation (Lithic Press, 2018)
 In the Odes (Magra Books, 2018)
 Coolidge & Cherkovski: In Conversation (Lithic Press, 2020)

References

External links
Twitter
www.neelicherkovski.net own website

A Prison Poem, a 2004 poem by Cherkovski
A few selected poems
Interview with Cherkovski.

1945 births
Living people
American male poets
Beat Generation writers
New College of California
PEN Oakland/Josephine Miles Literary Award winners
20th-century American poets
21st-century American poets
20th-century American male writers
21st-century American male writers